= Direk Lavansiri =

Prof. Emeritus Dr. Direk Lavansiri (Thai: ดิเรก ลาวัณย์ศิริ) is the Professor Emeritus of Engineering at Chulalongkorn University.

In 2002 and 2003, Lavansiri was awarded the Thailand Quality Class Award for Performance Excellence under the “organization” category.
